Blind Dating (also known as Blind Guy Driving) is a 2006 romantic comedy film directed by James Keach and starring Chris Pine, Eddie Kaye Thomas, Anjali Jay, Jane Seymour, and Jayma Mays. The film was produced by David Shanks and James Keach and distributed by Samuel Goldwyn Films LLC.

During its release, the film received mixed to negative reviews. The publication City Weekly proposed that actor Chris Pine receive a special award for "Best Performance in an Otherwise Inexplicable Film."

Plot
Danny Valddesechi (Chris Pine) is an intelligent, handsome, charming boy who happens to be blind. Having been blind from birth, he volunteers for a risky experimental visual prosthesis that may restore his sight—having a microchip installed in the visual cortex of his brain that connects to a camera that would give him only, at best, fuzzy black and white images. During the tests he meets a beautiful Indian nurse, Leeza (Anjali Jay). Meanwhile, because Danny is a virgin at 22, his brother Larry (Eddie Kaye Thomas), who runs a limousine service, gets him a string of hilariously disastrous blind dates in between rentals. When Danny finally realizes that he is falling for Leeza, she tells him she cannot see him anymore because she has been promised in an arranged marriage. Believing that Leeza did not pursue their relationship because of his being blind, Danny becomes depressed and stops taking the necessary tests for his brain surgery. Danny's family, his eccentric psychotherapist Dr. Evans (Jane Seymour) and eye doctor Dr. Perkins (Stephen Tobolowsky) advise him to continue because it is his only chance of seeing, and soon Danny is successfully operated on. He sees his family's faces for the first time, but not Leeza's, who was away, reluctantly preparing for her engagement party. Soon the experiment proves to be a failure, as the fragile prosthesis in his brain moves, clouding his already weak vision, and Danny goes back to being blind. Realizing that he really loves Leeza, he bursts into the engagement party, professing his love for her and saying "Love is how you speak to me. Love is how you touch me...and guide me showing me the way to go. And when we kiss, when we kiss, it moves me to my soul." The couple kiss. At this the marriage is called off and Danny and Leeza start over, learning more about each other's family and culture.

Cast

References

External links
 
 

2006 films
2006 romantic comedy films
American romantic comedy films
Films about blind people
Films shot in Utah
Films directed by James Keach
Films scored by Heitor Pereira
2000s English-language films
2000s American films